The eleventh season of the American comedy television series It's Always Sunny in Philadelphia premiered on FXX on January 6, 2016. The season consists of 10 episodes and concluded on March 9, 2016.

Cast

Main cast
 Charlie Day as Charlie Kelly
 Glenn Howerton as Dennis Reynolds
 Rob McElhenney as Mac
 Kaitlin Olson as Dee Reynolds
 Danny DeVito as Frank Reynolds

Recurring cast
 Mary Elizabeth Ellis as The Waitress
 David Hornsby as Cricket
 Artemis Pebdani as Artemis
 Lance Barber as Bill Ponderosa
 Catherine Reitman as Maureen Ponderosa
 Brian Unger as The Lawyer
 Andrew Friedman as Jack Kelly

Guest stars
 Andy Buckley as Andy
 Aisha Hinds as Caseworker
 Dean Cameron as David Drisko
 Courtney Gains as Roach
 Kevin Farley as Turkey
 Natasha Alam as Tatiana
 Richard Grieco as Richard Greico
 Reginald VelJohnson as Judge Melvoy
 Guillermo del Toro as Pappy McPoyle
 Brian Doyle-Murray as Captain Garcia
 Tuc Watkins as Scott
 Bryan Cogman as Insurance Adjuster

Production
The series was renewed for an eleventh and twelfth season on April 4, 2014, each to consist of 10 episodes.

Episodes

Reception
The eleventh season received positive reviews. On Rotten Tomatoes, it has an approval rating of 100% with an average score of 8.2 out of 10 based on 14 reviews. The website's critical consensus reads, "The Gang remains hopelessly toxic in an uproarious season filled with self-sabotage and routine recklessness, but viewers who love the series' craven humor probably wouldn't want them any other way."

References

External links

 
 

It's Always Sunny in Philadelphia
2016 American television seasons